Awake is the third studio album by Japanese rock band Wands. The album was released with new members. The album includes all singles released by new members of Wands. The album was released on October 27, 1999 under B-Gram Records label. It reached #18 on the Oricon charts for its first week with 16,940 sold copies. The album charted for 3 weeks and sold 25,640 copies. It was the band's final release before their disbandment in 2000. Prior to their disbandment, they released a compilation album entitled Best of Wands History.

Track listing

Cover
Zard later self-covered "Brand New Love" on their album Eien and "Ashita Moshi Kimi ga Kowaretemo" on Toki no Tsubasa.
Miho Komatsu covered "Sabitsuita Machine Gun de Ima wo Uchinikou" on her debut album Nazo.

References 

1999 albums
Wands (band) albums
Being Inc. albums
Japanese-language albums